Isabel Irving (February 28, 1871 –September 1, 1944) was an American stage actress.

Irving made her London debut at the Lyceum Theatre in 1890 as Daisy in Nancy and Company.

In 1894, she signed a three-year contract with the manager of the Lyceum Theatre in New York, stipulating "for the first time in her short career on stage," that she shall have "leading business." Until that time she had played the ingenue and other small parts.

Life
Isabel Irving was born in Bridgeport, Connecticut on February 28, 1871 to Charles Washington and Isabella Irving. She made her New York stage debut in c. 1886 at the Standard Theatre in The Schoolmistress under Rosina Vokes.

In 1899, after a secret engagement, Irving married the actor William H. Thompson who died in 1923.

In 1907, an Oregon newspaper (The Morning Oregonian) called her a "brilliant American actress" and "a charming actress and comedienne" during her national tour performance there in Susan In Search of a Husband.

She retired from her long career in theater in 1936 after completing her final tour in Three Wise Fools. She died in 1944 in Nantucket at 73.

Selected appearances 

Irving appeared in numerous productions during her 50-year career.

 The Schoolmistress (as Gwendoline)
 Pantomime Rehearsal
Nancy and Company (as Daisy)
 Gwynee's Oath (as the ingenue)
 Popping the Question (as the waiting maid)
 The Great Unknown (as Pansy)
 As You Like It (as Audrey)
 A Midsummer Night's Dream (as Oberon)
 The Hunchback (as Helen)
 The Last Word (as Miss Rutherell)
 The Arabian Nights (as Maitland)
 Needles and Pins
 The Critic
 The Lottery of Love
 The Cabinet Minister
She Stoops to Conquer
Merry Wives of Windsor
The Age of Innocence
Uncle Vanya
Three Wise Fools

Gallery

References

External links 

 
 Isabel Irving photo gallery at the NYP Library
 Actors Colony of Siasconset from the Nantucket Historical Association Digital Exhibition 'Sconset 02564

1871 births
1944 deaths
Actresses from Bridgeport, Connecticut
19th-century American actresses
American stage actresses
20th-century American actresses